Bradley Barritt (born 7 August 1986) is a South African-born former rugby union player. He played the position of centre.

Early life
Barritt attended Kearsney College.

Career

He had the ability to occasionally play fly half and did so to great effect in the 2006 Currie Cup season when perennially injured provincial team-mate Butch James was absent from the squad. However, due to the emergence of François Steyn at the coastal franchise, Barritt's opportunity to play fly half was curtailed, leading to him finding a more settled role as the Sharks' first-choice inside centre.

Barritt played in the 2007 Super 14 Final, losing by a solitary point to the Bulls.

He signed for the English Premiership side Saracens, and joined them after winning the 2008 Currie Cup.

Due to injuries, he was recalled to play in a 2009 Super 14 fixture against the Waratahs, his final game for the Sharks.

Barritt made his Saracens debut against Gloucester. During his time at Saracens he won five Premiership titles in 2011, 2015, 2016, 2018 and 2019, with Barritt featuring in all five finals. He also helped Saracens win the European Champions Cup in 2016, 2017 and 2019.

In June 2020, it was confirmed Barritt would leave Saracens at the conclusion of the 2019–20 season.

International career

Barritt played for South Africa against France in the final of the 2006 Under 21 Rugby World Championship.

He represented the Emerging Springboks at the IRB Nations Cup in 2007.

Barritt was selected by England coach Martin Johnson to represent the England Saxons at the 2009 Churchill Cup. This was possible because Barritt had not yet had a senior-level cap for another country, making him eligible for England as well as South Africa. Barritt's family has strong English roots, and many of his aunts and uncles live in England. Barritt's grandparents were born in England, and his grandfather played rugby union for English Universities. Barritt made his Saxons debut against the USA, scoring a try.

Barritt was called up to the England senior squad for the first time in 2010 to face the New Zealand Maori and again for the 2012 Six Nations Championship making his full debut against Scotland. He got his first points for England when he scored a try in a memorable win over New Zealand in December 2012.

On 15 June, Barritt was called up into the British & Irish Lions squad for the 2013 British & Irish Lions tour to Australia over injury concerns in the back line.

International tries

References

External links
Saracens profile
England profile

1986 births
Living people
Alumni of Kearsney College
British & Irish Lions rugby union players from England
British & Irish Lions rugby union players from South Africa
England international rugby union players
English rugby union players
Rugby union centres
Rugby union players from Durban
Saracens F.C. players
Sharks (Currie Cup) players
Sharks (rugby union) players
South African people of British descent
University of Natal alumni